The 2017–18 Israel State Cup (Gvia HaMedina) was the 79th season of Israel's nationwide Association football cup competition and the 64th after the Israeli Declaration of Independence.

The competition commenced in September 2017.

Preliminary rounds

First to fourth rounds

Rounds 1 to 4 double as cup competition for each division in Liga Bet and Liga Gimel. The two third-Round winners from each Liga Bet division and the fourth-Round winner from each Liga Gimel division advance to the sixth Round.

Liga Bet

Liga Bet North A

Hapoel Kaukab won the district cup and qualified along with Bnei HaGolan VeHagalil to the sixth round.

Liga Bet North B

F.C. Daburiyya won the district cup and qualified along with Hapoel Daliyat al-Karmel to the sixth round.

Liga Bet South A

Ironi Or Yehuda won the district cup and qualified along with Shimshon Bnei Tayibe to the sixth round.

Liga Bet South B

Maccabi Ashdod won the district cup and qualified along with Maccabi Kiryat Malakhi to the sixth round.

Liga Gimel

Liga Gimel Upper Galilee

Maccabi Ahva Sha'ab won the district cup and qualified to the sixth round.

Liga Gimel Lower Galilee

Maccabi Ironi Tamra won the district cup and qualified to the sixth round.

Liga Gimel Jezreel

Hapoel Bnei Musmus won the district cup and qualified to the sixth round.

Liga Gimel Shomron

F.C. Pardes Hanna Karkur won the district cup and qualified to the sixth round.

Liga Gimel Sharon

Ironi Ariel won the district cup and qualified to the sixth round.

Liga Gimel Tel Aviv

Shikun Vatikim Ramat Gan won the district cup and qualified to the sixth round.

Liga Gimel Center

Hapoel Bnei Ashdod won the district cup and qualified to the sixth round.

Liga Gimel South

Beitar Kiryat Gat won the district cup and qualified to the sixth round.

Fifth Round
The fifth Round is played within each division of Liga Alef. The winners qualify to the sixth Round

Sixth Rounds

Seventh Round
Hapoel Kfar Saba, Hapoel Hadera, Hapoel Marmorek and Hapoel Rishon LeZion were pre-qualified for the Next Round.

Eighth Round

Round of 16

Quarter-finals

First leg

The first legs will take place from 6 to 7 February 2018.

Second Leg

The second legs took place from 27 February to 1 March 2018.

1–1 on aggregate. Hapoel Ra'anana won on Penalty shootout 5–3.

Hapoel Ironi Kiryat Shmona won 2–1 on aggregate.

Beitar Jerusalem won 2–0 on aggregate.

3–3 on aggregate. Hapoel Haifa won on away goals.

Semi-finals
The two matches will take place from 30 March to 2 April 2018 at the Sammy Ofer Stadium in Haifa.

Final

The final was played on 9 May 2018 at the Teddy Stadium in Jerusalem.

Notes

References

External links
 Israel Football Association website 
soccerway

State Cup
Israel State Cup seasons